Let Me Hear You Say Yeah is a song by the Danish dance-pop duo Infernal. It was released as the second and final single from the album Muzaik, a revised edition of their second studio album, Waiting for Daylight, in 2002. The song samples PKA's "Let Me Hear You (Say Yeah)", written by Philip Kelsey.

Track listing

Credits and personnel
Written by Philip Kelsey
Produced by Infernal and Kristian Paulsen
Additional vocals by Nico
"Let Me Hear You Say Yeah" (Cannibal Radio) and (Cannibal Extended): remix by Hannibal Lector
"Let Me Hear You Say Yeah" (Spank!@TheMainRoom): remix by Spank!
"Serengeti": written by Paw Lagermann, Lina Rafn, De La Ray, Moses Malone. Produced by Infernal. Additional vocals by Moses Malone. Acid Mix by Infernal

Charts

References

2002 singles
2002 songs
Infernal (Danish band) songs